Wekerle Business School (Hungarian: Wekerle Sándor Üzleti Főiskola) is a private college in Budapest, Hungary.

Programs

Undergraduate Degree Programmes 

 BSc in Business Administration and Management
 BSc in Commerce and Marketing
 BSc in Human Resources
 BSc in International Business Economics
 BSc in Finance and Accounting
 BSc in Business Information Technology

High-level Vocational Education Programmes 

 Business Administration and Management at ISCED level 5
 Commerce and Marketing at ISCED level 5
 Human Resource Management at ISCED level 5
 Finance and Account at ISCED level 5

External links 
 http://wsuf.hu/ The Hungarian official website of WBS
 http://wbsc-h.eu/ The international website of WBS

Universities in Budapest
Business schools in Hungary
2006 establishments in Hungary
Educational institutions established in 2006